Chahid "The Pitbull" Oulad El Hadj (born 21 June 1988) is a Moroccan-Dutch welterweight kickboxer, fighting out of Bergen op Zoom, Netherlands.

El Hadj is known as a promising fighter who proved himself with his performances against some tough, solid fighters such as Gago Drago and Murat Direkçi. El Hadj is trained by his brother Hamid El Hadj.

Titles
 Dutch Champion
 2006 WFCA Benelux (-70 kg) champion

Notable fights
The K-1 World MAX 2010 Final 16 match between Chahid and the world champion Mike Zambidis on October the 3rd, 2010 is considered as one of the finest during a kickboxing competition.

Kickboxing record

|-  style="background:#fbb;"
| 2018-09-15 || Loss ||align=left| Nordin Van Roosmalen || | Enfusion 70  ||  Belgium ||Decision  || 3 || 3:00
|-  style="background:#fbb;"
| 2018-05-05 || Loss ||align=left| Robbie Hageman || |A1WCC Champions League Heavyweight Tournament  ||  Belgium ||Decision (Unanimous) || 3 || 3:00
|-  style="background:#fbb;"
| 2015-10-18 || Loss ||align=left| Mohammed Khamal || WFL "Unfinished Business" || Hoofddorp, Netherlands || KO || 2 || 
|-  style="background:#cfc;"
| 2014-05-10 || Win ||align=left| Edvin Kibus || Global Super Events Presents El Hadj vs Kibus || Bergen op Zoom, Netherlands || Decision (Unanimous) || 3 ||
|-  style="background:#fbb;"
| 2012-05-27 || Loss ||align=left| Mike Zambidis || K-1 World MAX 2012 World Championship Tournament Final 16 || Madrid, Spain || KO || 3 ||
|-  style="background:#fbb;"
| 2011-11-27 || Loss || style="text-align:left;"| Dzhabar Askerov || Rumble of the Kings 2011 || Stockholm, Sweden || TKO (retirement) || 1 ||
|-  style="background:#fbb;"
| 2011-09-24 || Loss ||align=left| Robin van Roosmalen || It's Showtime "Fast & Furious 70MAX", Quarter Finals || Brussels, Belgium || TKO (Corner stoppage)|| 2 || 2:40 
|-  style="background:#c5d2ea;"
| 2011-05-14 || NC ||align=left| Giorgio Petrosyan || It's Showtime 2011 Lyon || Lyon, France || No Contest (Low Blow) || 3 || 1:05
|-  style="background:#fbb;"
| 2011-03-06 || Loss ||align=left| Robin van Roosmalen || It's Showtime Sporthallen Zuid || Amsterdam, Netherlands || Decision (Majority) || 3 || 3:00 
|-  style="background:#cfc;"
| 2010-12-11 || Win ||align=left| Rafal Dudek || Yiannis Evgenikos presents: It’s Showtime Athens || Athens, Greece || Decision (4-1) || 3 || 3:00
|-  style="background:#fbb;"
| 2010-10-03 || Loss ||align=left| Mike Zambidis || K-1 World MAX 2010 Final 16 - Part 2 || Seoul, South Korea || Ext.R Decision (Unanimous) || 4 || 3:00 
|-
! style=background:white colspan=9 |
|-  style="background:#cfc;"
| 2010-06-19 ||Win  ||align=left| Yavuz Kayabasi || A1 World Combat Cup || Eindhoven, Netherlands || Decision || 3 || 3:00
|-  style="background:#cfc;"
| 2010-05-29 || Win ||align=left| Mohammed Khamal || It's Showtime 2010 Amsterdam || Amsterdam, Netherlands || Decision (5-0) || 3 || 3:00
|-  style="background:#cfc;"
| 2010-04-10 || Win ||align=left| Warren Stevelmans || Starmuay V || Maastricht, Netherlands || KO || 2 || 
|-  style="background:#fbb;"
| 2010-03-13 || Loss ||align=left| Sudsakorn Sor Klinmee || Oktagon presents: It's Showtime 2010 || Milan, Italy || Decision (Majority) || 3 || 3:00
|-  style="background:#fbb;"
| 2010-01-09 || Loss ||align=left| Hafid el Boustati || Ring Sensation Championships - Uprising 12 || Utrecht, Netherlands || Decision (Unanimous) || 3 || 3:00
|-  style="background:#fbb;"
| 2009-11-21 || Loss ||align=left| Chris Ngimbi || It's Showtime 2009 Barneveld || Barneveld, Netherlands || Decision (Unanimous) || 3 || 3:00
|-  style="background:#fbb;"
| 2009-10-24 || Loss ||align=left| Murat Direkci || It's Showtime 2009 Lommel || Lommel, Belgium || TKO (Doc. stop/cut) || 1|| 
|-
! style=background:white colspan=9 |
|-  style="background:#fbb;"
| 2009-09-25 || Loss ||align=left| Florian Abadie || World kickboxing championship WKN || Paris, France || TKO || 2 ||
|-  style="background:#cfc;"
| 2009-06-13 || Win ||align=left| William Diender || Gentleman Promotion || Tilburg, Netherlands || KO || 2 || 
|-  style="background:#fbb;"
| 2009-05-16 || Loss ||align=left| Andy Souwer || It's Showtime 2009 Amsterdam || Amsterdam, Netherlands || Decision (Unanimous)|| 3 || 3:00
|-  style="background:#fbb;"
| 2009-04-21 || Loss ||align=left| Nieky Holzken || K-1 World MAX 2009 Final 16 || Fukuoka, Japan || Decision (Majority) || 3 || 3:00
|-  style="background:#cfc;"
| 2009-02-08 || Win ||align=left| Fermin Rodriguez || Fights at the Border presents: It's Showtime 2009 || Antwerp, Belgium || Decision (Unanimous) || 3 || 3:00
|-  style="background:#cfc;"
| 2008-11-29 || Win ||align=left| Gago Drago || It's Showtime 2008 Eindhoven || Eindhoven, Netherlands || Decision || 3 || 3:00
|-  style="background:#fbb;"
| 2008-10-05 || Loss ||align=left| Ali Gunyar || Tough is not Enough || Rotterdam, Netherlands || Decision (Unanimous) || 3 || 3:00
|-
! style=background:white colspan=9 |
|-  style="background:#cfc;"
| 2008-05-24 || Win ||align=left| Murat Direkçi || Gentleman Promotions Fightnight || Tilburg, Netherlands || TKO (Referee stoppage) || 3 ||
|-  style="background:#cfc;"
| 2008-04-19 || Win ||align=left| Cagri Ermis || Muay Thai Gala Roosendaal || Roosendaal, Netherlands || Decision (Unanimous) || 5 || 3:00
|-  style="background:#c5d2ea;"
| 2008-03-15 || Draw ||align=left| Gago Drago || It's Showtime 75MAX Trophy 2008, Super Fight || 's-Hertogenbosch, Netherlands || Decision Draw || 5 || 3:00
|-  style="background:#c5d2ea;"
| 2008-01-26 || Draw ||align=left| Warren Stevelmans || Beast of the East || Zutphen, Netherlands || Decision Draw || 3 || 3:00
|-  style="background:#cfc;"
| 2007-11-24 || Win ||align=left| Koichi Kikuchi || Shootboxing || Rosmalen, Netherlands || Decision || 3 || 3:00
|-  style="background:#fbb;"
| 2007-06-02 || Loss ||align=left| Marco Pique || Gentleman Promotions Fightnight IV || Tilburg, Netherlands || Decision || 5 || 3:00
|-  style="background:#fbb;"
| 2007-05-06 || Loss ||align=left| Saenchanoi || Slamm 3|| Haarlem, Netherlands || Decision || 5 || 3:00
|-  style="background:#cfc;"
| 2007-04-07 || Win ||align=left| Samkor Kiatmontep || Balans Fight Night || Tilburg, Netherlands || Decision || 5 || 3:00
|-  style="background:#cfc;"
| 2007-01-27 || Win ||align=left| William Diender || Beast of the East || Zutphen, Netherlands || Decision || 3 || 3:00
|-  style="background:#cfc;"
| 2006-12-09 || Win ||align=left| Peter Hoes || Thaibox Gala || Roosendaal, Netherlands || Decision || 5 || 3:00
|-  style="background:#fbb;"
| 2006-11-19 || Loss ||align=left| Jan de Keyzer || Day of Talent 2 || Antwerp, Belgium || Disqualification || 3 ||
|-  style="background:#cfc;"
| 2006-06-25 || Win ||align=left| Valon Basha || Thaibox Gala || Bergen op Zoom, Netherlands || Decision || 5 || 3:00
|-  style="background:#fbb;"
| 2006-06-04 || Loss ||align=left| Faldir Chahbari || Gentleman Fightnight III || Tilburg, Netherlands || Decision (Unanimous) || 5 || 3:00
|-  style="background:#cfc;"
| 2006-04-09 || Win ||align=left| Said Ait Houhkari || Knock Out Combat 3 || Goes, Netherlands || Decision || 5 || 3:00
|-  style="background:#cfc;"
| 2006-03-05 || Win ||align=left| Arjan Vatnikai || Future Battle || Bergen op Zoom, Netherlands || Decision || 5 || 3:00
|-
! style=background:white colspan=9 |
|-  style="background:#cfc;"
| 2005-11-05 || Win ||align=left| Khalid Lazaar || Thaibox Gala in Breda || Breda, Netherlands || Decision || 5 || 2:00
|-  style="background:#cfc;"
| 2005-10-02 || Win ||align=left| Werner Stoel || Gentleman Fightnight 2 || Tilburg, Netherlands || TKO (Referee stoppage) || 5 ||
|-  style="background:#fbb;"
| 2005-07-16 || Loss ||align=left| Marvin Sansaar || Thaibox Gala || Zwolle, Netherlands || KO (Spinning Heel Kick) || 3 ||
|-  style="background:#cfc;"
| 2005-06-18 || Win ||align=left| Alexander Kreuger || Showdome IV || Amsterdam, Netherlands || Decision || 5 || 2:00
|-  style="background:#cfc;"
| 2005-05-22 || Win ||align=left| Malik van Kampen || Thaibox Gala || Goes, Netherlands || Decision || 5 || 2:00
|-  style="background:#cfc;"
| 2005-04-16 || Win ||align=left| Djiit Thanomrat || The Battle Zone || Breda, Netherlands || TKO || 5 ||
|-  style="background:#cfc;"
| 2005-01-31 || Win ||align=left| Karim El Jouharti || Time for Action || Nijmegen, Netherlands || Decision || 5 || 2:00
|-  style="background:#cfc;"
| 2005-01-01 || Win ||align=left| Sammie Panius || Thaiboxing Gala || Breda, Netherlands || Decision || 5 || 2:00
|-  style="background:#cfc;"
| 2004-09-04 || Win ||align=left| Reza Tuwannakotta || Last Man Standing || Eindhoven, Netherlands|| Decision || 5 || 2:00
|-  style="background:#cfc;"
| 2003-11-16 || Win ||align=left| Gino de Los Santos || Only the Strongest Survives || Rhoon, Netherlands|| Decision || 5 || 2:00
|-
| colspan=9 | Legend:

See also
List of K-1 events
List of male kickboxers
Muay Thai

References

External links
 El Hadj Profile 

1989 births
Living people
Dutch male kickboxers
Moroccan male kickboxers
Welterweight kickboxers
Dutch sportspeople of Moroccan descent
Sportspeople from Bergen op Zoom